Chamberlain ministry may refer to:

 First Chamberlain ministry, the British coalition government led by Neville Chamberlain from 1937 to 1939
 Second Chamberlain ministry, the British coalition government led by Neville Chamberlain from 1939 to 1940

See also
 National Government (United Kingdom)
 War ministry (disambiguation)